Kampong Birau is a village in the north-east of Tutong District, Brunei, about  from the district town Pekan Tutong. It is one of the villages within Mukim Kiudang, a mukim in the district.

Facilities 
Birau Primary School is the village primary school; it was inaugurated on 15 February 1955. It also shares grounds with Birau Religious School, the village school for the primary level of the country's Islamic religious education.

Kampong Birau Mosque is the village mosque; it was established on 18 January 1963. The current building was inaugurated on 2 August 1991 by the then Prince Al-Muhtadee Billah. It can accommodate 300 worshippers.

References 

Birau